Idhu Varai is a song from the 2010 Tamil feature film Goa, composed by Yuvan Shankar Raja and performed by Andrea Jeremiah and Ajeesh, the winner of the second season of the reality-based singing competition Airtel Super Singer. The song, with lyrics by Gangai Amaran, was released as part of the soundtrack album of the film on 6 January 2010. The song became one of the most popular songs in 2010.

Music video
The video is pictured on actors Jai and Piaa Bajpai. The song starts off with Piaa singing the song as a live performance on stage to Jai. He later interrupts the song and it continues playing in the background.

Reception
The song received a very positive response from critics. Pavithra Srinivasan a reviewer from the website Rediff said the song was "a romantic number penned by Gangai Amaren that clutches your heart at the appropriate moments. Certainly her vocal range keeps things interesting, not to mention the guitar strings and percussion which attain a faintly Hawaiian tang later on. The charanam brings back the song into perspective, and a melodious experience it is." Indiaglitz.com reviewer said: "A typical Yuvan number, it is rip-roaring and stylish all through. Yuvan seems to have opted for live drums here. The combination of the instruments provides a new sound. Trendy all the way, the song is pleasant to listen to." Behindwoods.com reviewer said: "A soft romantic number with very pleasant music bits that again have a distinct ‘Goan’ touch to them. Though this song gives you a ‘heard before’ feel, it has been stylishly put together and is likely to hit the charts soon for its unhurried sweetness." Top10cinema.com wrote it was a "prevalently fashioned tune of Yuvan Shankar Raja: more vitality exists on both vocalism and instrumentals. Followed by his previous composition Telugu song ‘Oye’, Yuvan has used live drums. Interludes with stringed instruments enhance the song."

The song was eventually listed in many Top 10 songs of the year and claimed as one of the most popular songs of the year.

Accolades

References 

2010 songs
Indian songs
Songs written for films
Songs with music by Yuvan Shankar Raja
Tamil-language songs
Tamil film songs